Melodic death metal (also referred to as melodeath) is a subgenre of death metal that employs highly melodic guitar riffs, often borrowing from traditional heavy metal (including New Wave of British Heavy Metal). The genre features the heaviness of death metal but with highly melodic or harmonized guitar riffs and solos, and often features high-pitched shrieked vocals (differing from traditional death metal) alongside the low-pitched growls commonly featured in traditional death metal. Pioneered by the English heavy metal band Carcass with their 1993 album Heartwork, melodic death metal developed further in Sweden (developed by bands like At the Gates, Dark Tranquillity, and In Flames) in the mid-1990s. The Swedish death metal scene did much to popularise the style, soon centering in the "Gothenburg metal" scene. At the Gates' Slaughter of the Soul, Dark Tranquility's The Gallery, and In Flames' The Jester Race, all released in the mid-1990s, were highly influential albums in melodic death metal, with At the Gates and In Flames being the two most common influences on North American 2000s heavy metal bands. Many American heavy metal bands emulated At the Gates' sound, resulting in the usage of the phrase "At the Gates worship".

In the late 1990s and early 2000s, many melodic death metal bands emerged, including Children of Bodom, Arch Enemy, Amon Amarth, The Black Dahlia Murder, Insomnium, and Soilwork. In the 2000s decade, melodic death metal achieved popularity among heavy metal fans, starting with the release of In Flames' 2002 album Reroute to Remain, which showed a change to a more eclectic sound while retaining the band's melodic death metal sound. Many other melodic death metal bands quickly had chart success.

In the mid-2000s, melodic metalcore, a subgenre of metalcore that combines the genre with melodic death metal, achieved popularity with the chart success and sales success of bands like Killswitch Engage, All That Remains, and As I Lay Dying. Deathcore bands during this time period like Bring Me the Horizon and Through the Eyes of the Dead also were influenced by melodic death metal and achieved popularity.

Musical characteristics
Melodic death metal combines death metal with elements of traditional heavy metal ranging as far as the New Wave of British Heavy Metal, especially melodic or harmonized guitar riffs, with the heavily distorted guitars, fast double-bass drum patterns and occasional blast beats of death metal. The vocal style typically features either high-pitched shrieks screaming (differing from traditional death metal) or low-pitched growling (similar to traditional death metal) and can feature clean sung vocals.

History

Origins (early–mid 1990s)

Much of the origin and popularity of melodic death metal can be attributed to the bands At the Gates, In Flames, and Dark Tranquillity, whose mid 1990s music releases (namely Slaughter of the Soul, The Jester Race, and The Gallery, respectively) defined the genre and laid the foundation for the Gothenburg metal scene. Writer Gary Sharpe-Young considered the Gothenburg scene the commercial salvation of death metal: "Gothenburg became the new Tampa and the genre received a new lease on life." The titular melodic elements can be traced to traditional Scandinavian musical motifs. Another pioneer was the English band Carcass, which performed grindcore on its first two releases but morphed into death metal and an increasingly melodic style on the Necroticism – Descanting the Insalubrious (1991) and Heartwork (1993). Death's 1995 album Symbolic is also considered to be influential in the development of the genre. Ceremonial Oath and Eucharist also are early melodic death metal bands; however, they never gained much attention outside of their own scene.

In Flames' The Jester Race combined death metal with guitar riffs heavily influenced by bands like Iron Maiden and Judas Priest. The album's sound heavily contrasted with traditional death metal, and made Swedish death metal more accessible to more people compared to other Swedish death metal albums that pioneered a new sound, including the death 'n' roll of Entombed's Wolverine Blues. At the Gates' Slaughter of the Soul influenced many American metal bands, especially metalcore bands who used guitar riffs and vocals emulating At the Gates' music. The vocals also were noted by AllMusic for being more decipherable than other death metal vocals, resembling high-pitched shrieks that foreshadowed 2000s American screamo bands. The album brought At the Gates underground popularity, including rotation on MTV's Headbanger's Ball, a nomination at the Swedish Grammys, and American tours with Morbid Angel and Napalm Death.

Expansion (Late 1990s and early 2000s)

In the late 1990s and early 2000s, melodic death metal quickly expanded with many bands emerging, including Amon Amarth, The Black Dahlia Murder, Arch Enemy, Soilwork, Insomnium, and Children of Bodom. Additionally, other genres would begin using melodic death metal as an influence, including melodic metalcore and melodic black/death. Stewart Mason claims that melodic metalcore has become very popular in the United States, using the term "Swedecore" to describe Scandinavian-style metal as played by non-Nordic bands. Many melodic death metal and metalcore bands (especially after melodic metalcore band Killswitch Engage rose in popularity) were heavily influenced by Slaughter of the Soul by At the Gates and had an influence of them in their music. Many heavy metal bands in the mid-2000s, in turn, were labeled "At the Gates worship".

Popularity and emergence of melodic metalcore (2000s)

In the 2000s, melodic death metal became popular among heavy metal fans. In 2002, In Flames' album Reroute to Remain peaked at number 10 on the Top Heatseekers chart. The album, retaining the band's melodic death metal sound, showed a diverse mix of different musical genres, including occasional electronica and hip hop synthesizers and occasional clean singing. This helped gain the band a new amount of fans while alienating fans of In Flames' early work. In Flames' next two albums, Soundtrack to Your Escape (2004) and Come Clarity (2006), peaked at numbers 145 and 58 on the Billboard 200, respectively, with the latter album giving In Flames a Swedish Grammy Award. The Black Dahlia Murder, Arch Enemy, Children of Bodom, and Amon Amarth also enter the Billboard 200 during the 2000s decade. In the mid–late 2000s, melodic metalcore became one of the most popular heavy metal genres, with bands like Killswitch Engage, Unearth, Bullet for My Valentine, All That Remains, Shadows Fall and Atreyu achieving success, headlining major festivals and selling a lot of records. Melodic metalcore combined melodic death metal elements like melodic guitar riffs and screaming with elements of the original style of metalcore like breakdowns. At the Gates and In Flames were major influences on these bands. Killswitch Engage are often credited as the band that brought melodic metalcore into the mainstream among heavy metal fans. Some deathcore bands during this time, such as Through the Eyes of the Dead and Bring Me the Horizon, combined deathcore with melodic death metal.

Subgenres

Many melodic death metal bands began being inspired by black metal and European romanticism. This style has been referred to as blackened melodic death metal, melodic blackened death metal and  However, unlike most other black metal, this take on the genre would incorporate an increased sense of melody and narrative.

Melodic metalcore is a fusion genre, incorporating elements of metalcore and melodic death metal, with a heavy emphasis on melodic instrumentation, blast beats, metalcore-stylized breakdowns and clean singing. These bands often take influence from the guitar riffs and writing styles of Swedish melodic death metal bands, especially At the Gates, In Flames, Arch Enemy and Soilwork.

See also
 List of melodic death metal bands
 New Wave of British Heavy Metal
 Swedish death metal

References

 
Death metal
Heavy metal genres
Music in Gothenburg
Swedish styles of music
1990s in music
2000s in music